Corcova is a commune located in Mehedinți County, Oltenia, Romania. It is composed of thirteen villages: Breța, Cernaia, Corcova, Cordun, Croica, Gârbovățu de Jos, Imoasa, Jirov, Măru Roșu, Pârvulești, Pușcașu, Stejaru and Vlădășești.

References

Communes in Mehedinți County
Localities in Oltenia